The following persons have served as British High Commissioner to Sri Lanka, previously known as Ceylon. Countries belonging to the Commonwealth of Nations typically exchange High Commissioners rather than Ambassadors. Though there are a few technical differences, they are in practice one and the same office. Since 1965 when the Maldives were granted independence from the United Kingdom, the British High Commissioner to Sri Lanka has doubled as the (non-resident) British High Commissioner to the Maldives (from 1982 to 2016, and since 1 February 2020) and as the British Ambassador to the Maldives (1965 to 1982, and October 2016 to 2020).

British High Commissioners to the Dominion of Ceylon 

 1948–1951: Sir Walter Hankinson 
 1951–1957: Sir Cecil Syers 
 1957–1962: Sir Alexander Morley 
 1962–1966: Sir Michael Walker 
 1966–1969: Sir Stanley Tomlinson 
 1969–1972: Sir Angus Mackintosh

British High Commissioners to Sri Lanka 

 1972–1975: Sir Harold Smedley 
 1976–1979: David Aiers 
 1979–1984: Sir John Nicholas 
 1984–1987: John Stewart 
 1987–1991: David Gladstone 
 1991–1996: John Field 
 1996–1999: David Tatham 
 1999–2002: Linda Duffield 
 2002–2006: Stephen Evans 
 2006–2008: Dominick Chilcott 
 2008–2011: Peter Hayes
 2011–2015: John Rankin
 2015–2019: James Dauris

 2019–: Sarah Hulton

References

External links 

British High Commission Colombo

Sri Lanka
 
United Kingdom High Commissioner
 
United Kingdom High Commissioner
United Kingdom High Commissioner
United Kingdom High Commissioner